Lavinia Clara Radeglia (1879 in Kensington – 1947 in Budleigh Salterton), was an English badminton player. She first played badminton in 1903 at the Richmond Badminton Club. She became an England international in 1909 and won four All England titles. She was a one time editor of the Badminton Gazette and a well known Lawn Tennis player and became a professional tennis coach.

Medal Record at the All England Badminton Championships

References

English female badminton players
1879 births
1947 deaths
English female tennis players